Events from the year 1980 in art.

Events
 January 1 – Gary Larson's single-panel comic The Far Side debuts in the San Francisco Chronicle.
 February 7 – Pink Floyd's The Wall Tour opens at the Los Angeles Memorial Sports Arena.
 May 22–September 16 – Pablo Picasso Retrospective exhibition at the Museum of Modern Art in New York City, the largest and most complete Picasso exhibition ever held in the United States.
 December 8 – Annie Leibovitz photographs John Lennon with Yoko Ono in New York for the cover of Rolling Stone magazine five hours before his murder.
 Robert Hughes presents a series (with accompanying book), The Shock of the New, for BBC Television in the United Kingdom on "art and the century of change".
 Benedikt Taschen opens a comic book store in Cologne which will evolve into the art book publisher Taschen.

Exhibitions
February 17 until April 6 - "Afro-American Abstraction" (curated by April Kingsley at MoMA PS1 in New York City.

Works

 Basil Blackshaw – Green Landscape
 Arbit Blatas – The Monument of the Holocaust (reliefs, first edition)
 Alan Chung Hung – Gate to the Northwest Passage (sculpture, Vancouver, British Columbia)
 David Inshaw – The River Bank (Ophelia)
 Keith Jellum – Mimir (sculpture, Portland, Oregon)
 Nabil Kanso
 Apocalyptic Rider
 Time Suspended in Space (South Africa)
 Peter Kennard – Haywain with Cruise Missiles
 Georgia O'Keeffe – Llama in the Desert
 Bryan Organ – Harold Macmillan, 1st Earl of Stockton
 Howard Post – Moving Cattle
 George Segal – Gay Liberation (sculpture)

Awards
John Moores Painting Prize - Michael Moon for "Box-room"

Births

Deaths

January to June
 January 9 – Joy Adamson, Austria-Kenyan painter and conservationist (b. 1908).
 January 18 – Cecil Beaton, English photographer and stage and costume designer (b. 1904).
 January 20 – William Roberts, painter (b. 1904).
 January 26 – Dolly Rudeman, Dutch graphic designer (b. 1902).
 February 4 – Stojan Aralica, famous Serbian Impressionist painter and academic (b. 1883).
 February 6 – Albert Kotin, Russian-born American Abstract Expressionist artist (b. 1907).
 February 17 – Graham Sutherland, English artist (b. 1903).
 February 22 – Oskar Kokoschka, Austrian artist, poet and playwright (b. 1886).
 March 5 – John Skeaping, English sculptor and equine painter (b. 1901).
 March 18 – Tamara de Lempicka, Polish Art Deco painter (b. 1898).
 April 21
 Ľudovít Fulla, Slovak painter, graphic artist, illustrator, stage designer and art teacher (b. 1902).
 Sohrab Sepehri, Persian poet and a painter (b. 1928).
 May 15 – Len Lye, New Zealand-born American kinetic sculptor and filmmaker (b. 1901).
 May 16 – Izis Bidermanas, Lithuanian-born photographer (b. 1911).
 June 7 – Philip Guston, Canadian-born American Abstract Expressionist painter and printmaker (b. 1913).
 June 23 – Clyfford Still, American Abstract Expressionist painter (b. 1904).

July to December
 July 16 – Robert Brackman, Ukrainian-born American painter and art teacher (b. 1898)
 August 26 – Tex Avery, American animator, cartoonist, and director (b. 1908).
 September 14 – Maxwell Bates, Canadian architect and expressionist painter (b. 1906).
 November 22 – Norah McGuinness, Irish painter and illustrator (b. 1901).
 December 26 – Tony Smith, American sculptor, visual artist and theorist on art (b. 1912).
 December 30 – Patrick Hennessy, Irish painter (b. 1915).

See also
 1980 in fine arts of the Soviet Union

References

 
Years of the 20th century in art
1980s in art

ru:1980 год в истории изобразительного искусства СССР